This is a list of defunct college football conferences in the United States and a defunct university football conference in Canada. Not all of the conferences listed here are truly defunct. Some simply stopped sponsoring football and continue under their current names, where others changed their names after changes in membership.

United States
Conferences whose charter no longer functions, listed by year of dissolution.
██ indicates a former Division I FBS/I–A or University Division conference
██ indicates a former Division I FCS/I–AA conference
██ indicates a former Division II/College Division conference
██ indicates a former Division III conference
██ indicates a former NAIA conference
† indicates a former conference, of any level, that technically still exists but under a different name
‡ indicates a conference that still exists but has ended its sponsorship of football
Successor conferences in bold are still in existence:

Notes

Canada
 Ontario-Québec Intercollegiate Football Conference (1975-2000) – This conference existed with varying membership with many Ontario teams leaving for the current Ontario University Athletics in 1980. The remaining Ontario teams departed after the 2000 season and the remaining Quebec teams ultimately became the Quebec University Football League  in 2004.

See also
List of defunct college football teams

References

External links
Previous Conferences, A–F, College Football Data Warehouse, accessed February 20, 2009.
Previous Conferences, G–M, College Football Data Warehouse, accessed February 20, 2009.
Previous Conferences, N–Z, College Football Data Warehouse, accessed February 20, 2009.

College football-related lists

College football